Benjamín Teplizky Lijavetzky (12 September 1932 − 3 August 1997) was a Chilean politician who served as minister. Similarly, he is a very recognized figure in his country, where there's an energetic prize with his name.

References

External links
 Profile at Annales de la República

1932 births
1997 deaths
Chilean people of Jewish descent
20th-century Chilean lawyers
University of Chile alumni
Radical Party of Chile politicians
Radical Social Democratic Party of Chile politicians